Thomas B. Saviello (born August 29, 1950) is an American politician. Saviello is a Republican former State Senator from Maine's 17th District, representing part of Kennebec and Franklin Counties, including the population center of Farmington and his residence in Wilton. He was first elected to the Maine State Senate in 2010 after serving for 8 years (4 terms) in the Maine House of Representatives and two years on the District 9 School Board. His private experience is primarily in the field of forestry; Saviello works as a manager for International Paper. He was born in Englewood, New Jersey and is a graduate of the University of Tennessee and the University of Maine.

First elected as a Democrat, Saviello is known to cross party lines on measures and draw the ire of more conservative Republicans, including Governor Paul LePage. As a Republican, he supported Democrat Jared Golden in his 2018 campaign for Congress against incumbent Republican Bruce Poliquin.  In 2017, he helped fundraise for Democratic gubernatorial candidate Janet Mills.

References

External links

|-

|-

|-

1950 births
Living people
People from Wilton, Maine
People from Englewood, New Jersey
University of Tennessee alumni
University of Maine alumni
Republican Party members of the Maine House of Representatives
Republican Party Maine state senators
21st-century American politicians